Valery Viktorovich Plotnikov (born 12 June 1962) is a retired Russian professional footballer.

Honours
 Soviet Cup finalist: 1990.

European club competitions
 European Cup Winners' Cup 1986–87 with FC Torpedo Moscow: 4 games, 1 goal.
 European Cup 1989–90 with FC Dnipro Dnipropetrovsk: 1 game.

External links
 Profile at playerhistory.com

1962 births
People from Kashira
Living people
Soviet footballers
Russian footballers
Russian expatriate footballers
Expatriate footballers in Germany
PFC CSKA Moscow players
FC Torpedo Moscow players
FC Rotor Volgograd players
FC Dnipro players
FC Lokomotiv Moscow players
FC Sokol Saratov players
SpVgg Ludwigsburg players
Association football midfielders
FC Iskra Smolensk players
Sportspeople from Moscow Oblast